Armani Watts (born March 19, 1996) is an American football safety who is a free agent. He played college football at Texas A&M and was drafted by the Kansas City Chiefs in the fourth round of the 2018 NFL draft.

Early years
Watts attended and played high school football at North Forney High School.

College career
Watts attended and played college football at Texas A&M from 2014 to 2017 under head coach Kevin Sumlin. He was a four-year starter for the Aggies and led the team in interceptions as a freshman. In 2017, he started 12 games, had 87 tackles, 10 for loss, four interceptions, five pass breakups, two fumble recoveries and two blocked kicks. Watts was an All-SEC selection and third-team All-America.

Professional career

Kansas City Chiefs
Watts was drafted by the Kansas City Chiefs in the fourth round with the 124th overall pick in the 2018 NFL Draft, using the fourth-round pick acquired in the Marcus Peters trade. In Week 4, against the Denver Broncos, he recorded his first career sack. He was placed on injured reserve on October 9, 2018, after suffering a groin injury in Week 5. Watts won Super Bowl LIV when the Chiefs defeated the San Francisco 49ers 31–20.

Indianapolis Colts
On April 5, 2022, Watts signed with the Indianapolis Colts. He was placed on injured reserve on August 30, 2022.

References

External links
Texas A&M Aggies bio
Kansas City Chiefs bio

1996 births
Living people
American football safeties
Indianapolis Colts players
Kansas City Chiefs players
People from Forney, Texas
Players of American football from Texas
Sportspeople from the Dallas–Fort Worth metroplex
Texas A&M Aggies football players